Brendan Reid McLane (born 1968) is a United States Navy rear admiral and surface warfare officer who serves as Commander, Naval Surface Forces Atlantic since May 3, 2021. He previously served as Special Assistant to the commander of the United States Fleet Forces Command, with terms as commander of Carrier Strike Group 10 from May to December 2020 and commander of Navy Recruiting Command from July 2018 to April 2020.

A 1990 graduate of the United States Naval Academy with a Bachelor of Science degree in history, McLane also earned a Master of Science degree in public administration from Troy University, as well as a master's degree in national security affairs from the Naval War College. He completed Massachusetts Institute of Technology's Seminar XXI and the Naval Operational Planning Course (now the Maritime Advanced Warfighting School).

References

|-

|-

|-

1968 births
Date of birth missing (living people)
Living people
Place of birth missing (living people)
United States Naval Academy alumni
Troy University alumni
Naval War College alumni
Recipients of the Legion of Merit
United States Navy admirals